Marc Jason Kroon (born April 2, 1973) is an American former right-handed relief pitcher. He served as the closer for the Yomiuri Giants of Japan's Central League.

Career
He was drafted 72nd overall by the New York Mets in 1991. The Mets traded him to the San Diego Padres in 1993 as the player to be named later in an earlier trade for Frank Seminara. The Padres traded Kroon to the Cincinnati Reds for Buddy Carlyle in April 1998.

Kroon retired following elbow surgeries and did not play baseball at any level in 2001 or 2002. He came out of retirement and joined the Anaheim Angels organization in 2003 after coach Mike Butcher's brother-in-law saw him giving a pitching lesson in a park.

Kroon joined the Yokohama BayStars in 2005. After the 2007 season, Kroon and the BayStars failed to come to terms on a new contract, and ended up being a free agent. Kroon was later signed by the Yomiuri Giants along with two other major non-Japanese free agents: former Tokyo Yakult Swallows standouts Seth Greisinger, and Alex Ramirez.

In 2008, Kroon led the Central League in saves with 41. He also broke his own record of pitching to 162 km/h (101 mph).

Kroon signed a minor league contract with an invitation for spring training with the San Francisco Giants in 2011. Kroon was reassigned to triple-A Fresno Grizzlies at the end of spring training.

Kroon was featured in the Showtime television production The Franchise.

On March 8, 2012, Kroon retired.

References

External links

Archived version of Marc Kroon's website while in Japan

1973 births
Living people
Major League Baseball pitchers
Colorado Rockies players
San Diego Padres players
Cincinnati Reds players
African-American baseball players
American expatriate baseball players in Japan
Yokohama BayStars players
Yomiuri Giants players
Rancho Cucamonga Quakes players
Memphis Chicks players
Las Vegas Stars (baseball) players
Indianapolis Indians players
Arizona League Mariners players
Tacoma Rainiers players
Albuquerque Dukes players
Arkansas Travelers players
Salt Lake Stingers players
Colorado Springs Sky Sox players
Sportspeople from the Bronx
Baseball players from New York City
Capital City Bombers players
Fresno Grizzlies players
Gulf Coast Mets players
Kingsport Mets players
21st-century African-American sportspeople
20th-century African-American sportspeople